Nottingham City Council elections are held every four years. Nottingham City Council is the local authority for the unitary authority  of Nottingham in Nottinghamshire, England. Until 1 April 1998 it was a non-metropolitan district. Since the last boundary changes in 2019, 55 councillors are elected from 20 wards.

Political control
From 1889 to 1974 Nottingham was a county borough, independent of any county council. Under the Local Government Act 1972 it became a non-metropolitan district, with Nottinghamshire County Council providing county-level services. The first election to the reformed city council was held in 1973, initially operating as a shadow authority before coming into its revised powers on 1 April 1974. Nottingham became a unitary authority on 1 April 1998, regaining its independence from Nottinghamshire County Council. Political control of the city council since 1973 has been held by the following parties:

Non-metropolitan district

Unitary authority

Leadership
The role of Lord Mayor of Nottingham is largely ceremonial. Political leadership is instead provided by the leader of the council. The leaders since 1983 have been:

Council elections

1973 Nottingham City Council election
1976 Nottingham City Council election (New ward boundaries)
1979 Nottingham City Council election
1983 Nottingham City Council election
1987 Nottingham City Council election (City boundary changes took place but the number of seats remained the same)
1991 Nottingham City Council election
1995 Nottingham City Council election
1997 Nottingham City Council election
1999 Nottingham City Council election
2003 Nottingham City Council election (New ward boundaries)
2007 Nottingham City Council election
2011 Nottingham City Council election
2015 Nottingham City Council election
2019 Nottingham City Council election (New ward boundaries)

City result maps

By-election results

This by-election was triggered by the death of Conservative councillor David Flowerday. Following the by-election the council was under no overall control, with both Labour and the Conservatives holding 27 seats, with the balance of power held by the only other councillor, John Peck of the Communist Party.

References

External links

 
Politics of Nottingham
Council elections in Nottinghamshire
Unitary authority elections in England